Flugestone acetate (FGA), sold under the brand name Cronolone among others, is a progestin medication which is used in veterinary medicine.

Uses

Veterinary
FGA is used as an intravaginal sponge preparation to synchronize estrus in ewes and goats.

Chemistry

FGA, also known as 17α-acetoxy-9α-fluoro-11β-hydroxyprogesterone or as 17α-acetoxy-9α-fluoro-11β-hydroxypregn-4-ene-3,20-dione, is a synthetic pregnane steroid and a derivative of progesterone and 17α-hydroxyprogesterone. It is the C17α acetate ester of flugestone.

History
FGA was developed and marketed by G.D. Searle & Company in the 1960s.

Society and culture

Generic names
FGA is also known by its developmental code names NSC-65411 and SC-9880.

Brand names
FGA is or has been marketed under the brand names Chronogest, Chrono-Gest, Crono-Gest, Cronolone, Gyncro-Mate, Ova-Gest, Ovakron, Synchro-Mate, Syncro Part, and Syncropart.

Availability
FGA is marketed for veterinary use in Australia, France, Ireland, Israel, Italy, the Netherlands, South Africa, and the United Kingdom.

References

Acetate esters
Diketones
Secondary alcohols
Organofluorides
Glucocorticoids
Halohydrins
Pregnanes
Progestogen esters
Progestogens
Veterinary drugs